Berkley School District is a United States school district serving the entirety of Berkley, Huntington Woods, and the northern portion of Oak Park, in the state of Michigan. The superintendent is Scott Francis.  Created in 1840, the district currently serves 4,700 students.  The Center of Advanced Studies & the Arts is a special consortium school that draws high school students from 6 six neighboring school districts.  CASA offers courses that would not otherwise have enough students to be taught within one district.

It operates the following schools:

Anderson Middle School (opened 1957)- Gr 6-8
Angell Elementary School (opened 1921) - Gr K-5
Berkley Building Blocks (formerly Tyler/Avery Elementary, opened 1951 became preschool and admin offices in 2006, converted to full preschool in 2018) - Preschool and Child Care
Berkley High School (opened 1948, expanded since)- Gr 9-12
Burton Elementary School (opened 1925, sister school to Pattengill)- Gr PreK-5
Norup International School (formerly Norup Middle School, opened 1957; converted to grades 3-8 in 2002, became K-8 in 2006) - Gr K-8
Pattengill Elementary School (opened 1925, sister school to Burton)- Gr PreK-5
Rogers Elementary School (formerly Hamilton Elementary, opened 1955)- Gr K-5
Tyndall Administration Center (formerly Tyndall Elementary, previously housed Building Blocks; converted to administration building in 2018)
Tri-County Educational Center - Kennedy Center - Alternative High School & Adult Education
Center for Advanced Studies & the Arts
Oakland Schools Technical Campus S.E
Angell is currently the oldest continually operating elementary school in Oakland County.
Pattengill was on the list of the 2015 National Blue Ribbon Schools

In addition, some students originally from the Berkley School District attend the International Academy in Bloomfield Hills for high school.

The district formerly operated the following schools:

 Blackmon School (opened 1840, closed 1901. Sold to a local resident after South School opened)
 South School (Opened 1901, converted to dormitory for teachers in 1920 due to the opening of Angell School)
 Temporary Berkley School (Unknown name. Opened 1918, sold to Berkley Community Church and razed after Berkley School opened)
 Berkley School (later called Berkley Elementary, opened 1922, closed and demolished in 1979. Parts of the school saved from demolition now serve as the district maintenance shop and the headquarters for Berkley Robotics)
 Oxford Elementary (later Oxford Center, opened 1951, closed to students in 1983, served as district administration offices until 2006. Demolished 2007, currently the site of housing and Oxford Park which was purchased by the city in 2014)

External links
Berkley School District Official site.

References

School districts in Michigan
Education in Oakland County, Michigan
1840 establishments in Michigan